Angelo Pereni (died 11 September 2020) was an Italian football player and coach.

Career
Pereni played as a midfielder for Legnano, Novara, Catania, Palermo and Pro Vercelli.

He later became a coach, and was assistant manager of the Albania national team under Gianni De Biasi.

References

1940s births
2020 deaths
Italian footballers
A.C. Legnano players
Novara F.C. players
Catania S.S.D. players
Palermo F.C. players
F.C. Pro Vercelli 1892 players
Serie A players
Serie B players
Serie C players
Association football midfielders
Italian football managers
U.S. Lecce managers